Tallar Sar-e Gharbi (also Romanized as Ţallār Sar-e  Gharbī; also known as Ţalārsar) is a village in Chehel Shahid Rural District, in the Central District of Ramsar County, Mazandaran Province, Iran. At the 2006 census, its population was 366, in 97 families.

References 

Populated places in Ramsar County